The Shenyang Botanical Garden, also known as "Shenyang World Expo Garden" , is located in Qipanshan Tourism Development Zone, in the eastern suburb of Shenyang City, Liaoning, China. It was the site of the 2006 China Shenyang World Horticultural Exposition, and is a 5A Tourist Attraction of China.

The Shenyang Botanical Garden was founded in February 1959.

History
In February 1959, the Shenyang Botanical Garden was established.
From its establishment to the 1970s, the Shenyang Botanical Garden had little development.
Since the late 1980s, the construction of the Shenyang Botanical Garden has developed rapidly and has become a popular scenic spot.
In April 2002, the Shenyang Municipal Government classified the Shenyang Botanical Garden from the Shenyang Construction Administration Bureau as the Shenyang Qipanshan Development Zone Administrative Committee.
In July 2004, the Shenyang Botanical Garden was awarded the titles of the 4A tourist attraction and then the 5A tourist attraction.
From May 1st to October 31st, 2006, the Shenyang Botanical Garden hosted the 2006 Shenyang World Horticultural Exposition.

See also
Tourist attractions of Shenyang

References

External links
Official site

Botanical gardens in China
Tourist attractions in Shenyang
Buildings and structures in Shenyang